Freraeini is a tribe of flies in the family Tachinidae.

Genera
Freraea Robineau-Desvoidy, 1830

References

Brachycera tribes
Dexiinae